Ciarán Ward (born 17 January 1972) is an Irish judoka. He competed at the 1992 Summer Olympics and the 1996 Summer Olympics.

References

External links
 
 
 

1972 births
Living people
Irish male judoka
Olympic judoka of Ireland
Judoka at the 1992 Summer Olympics
Judoka at the 1996 Summer Olympics
Sportspeople from Belfast
20th-century Irish people